Charles Ridley Duppuy (杜培義, 22 September 188126 September 1944) was an  Anglican bishop.

Early life and career
He was born on 22 September 1881, the son of a priest (C. Duppuy), and educated at Keble College, Oxford.

He was ordained in 1904 (the last year before the Diocese of Birmingham was founded) and his first post was as a curate in Aston; after which he was Vicar of Christchurch, Bradford.

Chaplain
Duppuy was released from his post in Bradford to serve for 13 months as a Temporary Chaplain to the Forces from January 1918. He was described in his interview with the Chaplain-General as ‘manly, quick, keen...’ and was posted to France attached to the 42nd Division Royal Artillery. A Report described him as a priest of great energy and boundless enthusiasm. He had organising ability and was businesslike and very conscientious ‘a wonderful influence amongst officers and men. One of the best chaplains in the army’. The Deputy Chaplain-General was less laudatory regarding Duppuy as ‘satisfactory’ and ‘No great speaker or preacher’. Duppuy was demobilised in March, 1919.

Bishop
Appointed Bishop of Victoria, Hong Kong in 1920 he resigned in 1932 to take up an appointment in Britain as a Canon residentiary of Worcester Cathedral. He remained Canon until his death, but added to it the posts of Assistant Bishop of Worcester from 1936, Archdeacon of Worcester from 1938 and Vice-Dean of the cathedral from 1940. He died on 26 September 1944.

References

1881 births
Archdeacons of Worcester
Alumni of Keble College, Oxford
Anglican bishops of Victoria, Hong Kong
20th-century Anglican bishops in China
1944 deaths